Luis Alberto may refer to:

Luis Alberto (footballer, born 1943), Argentine football attacking midfielder
Luís Alberto (footballer, born 1983), Luís Alberto Silva dos Santos, Brazilian football midfielder
Luis Alberto (footballer, born 1992), Luis Alberto Romero Alconchel, Spanish football attacking midfielder
Luis Alberto, winner of the 1986 art prize of the Prince Pierre Foundation

See also
Luiz Alberto (disambiguation)